Motibhai Chaudhary (1923-2005) was an Indian politician and was the member of 6th Lok Sabha from Banaskantha. He started his political career in 1972 when he was elected to Gujarat Legislative Assembly. He was Minister of Transport in Gujarat. He was chairman of Dudhsagar Dairy.

References

1923 births
2005 deaths
India MPs 1977–1979
Janata Party politicians
Indian National Congress politicians from Gujarat
Indian National Congress (Organisation) politicians
Bharatiya Lok Dal politicians
Gujarat MLAs 1975–1980
People from Mehsana district
Lok Sabha members from Gujarat
Gujarat MLAs 1972–1974